WPVQ-FM (95.3 MHz, "Bear Country 95.3") is a radio station licensed to serve Greenfield, Massachusetts. The station is owned by Saga Communications and licensed to Saga Communications of New England, LLC. It airs a country music format.

History
In August 1996, Dynacom purchased WRSI (95.3 FM) and WGAM from Radio Skutnik, Inc. (Ed Skutnik, owner) for a reported sale price of $650,000. In August 1999, Vox Media Corp. purchased Dynacom and all of its radio assets, including WRSI, for a reported $5.5 million.

In July 2000, Vox purchased WPVQ (93.9 FM) from Cardwell Broadcasting for a reported sale price of $2.925 million.

In February 2001, WPVQ swapped frequencies with WRSI so that WRSI now broadcasts on 93.9 MHz from Turners Falls, Massachusetts, and WPVQ broadcasts on its current 95.3 MHz. The 95.3 FM station was assigned the WPVQ call letters by the Federal Communications Commission on February 1, 2001.

In December 2003, Saga Communications announced that it had reached an agreement to purchase WRSI (93.9 FM) and WPVQ (95.3 FM) plus WRSY (101.5 FM) from Vox. The $7 million deal closed in April 2004. The station's call sign was modified to WPVQ-FM on October 5, 2018.

HD subchannels
On February 1, 2021, WPVQ-FM launched a soft adult contemporary format on its HD2 subchannel, branded as "EZ 107.5"; the branding reflects its carriage on translator W298CA (107.5 FM) in Greenfield.

, WPVQ-FM's HD3 subchannel serves as the origination for the classic country format, branded "92.3 The Outlaw", carried on W222CH (92.3 FM) in Greenfield. The "Outlaw" programming and the 92.3 translator had been associated with WPVQ (700 AM) prior to Saga's sale of that station in 2022.

References

External links

PVQ-FM
Country radio stations in the United States
Mass media in Franklin County, Massachusetts
Greenfield, Massachusetts
Radio stations established in 1981